Nyzhnie Lozove is a village in Bakhmut Raion (district) in Donetsk Oblast of eastern Ukraine, at 61.8 km NE from the centre of Donetsk city.

The settlement was taken under control of pro-Russian forces during the War in Donbass, that started in 2014.

Demographics
In 2001 the settlement had 11 inhabitants. Native language as of the Ukrainian Census of 2001:
Ukrainian – 100.00%

References

Villages in Bakhmut Raion